Anuradha Yahampath is a Sri Lankan textile designer, exporter and current Governor of the Eastern Province of Sri Lanka. She is also the director of Kandys, a handloom brand in Sri Lanka and she is also the current chairperson of the National Entrepreneurs Association of Sri Lanka.

Career 
She is an alumnus of the University of Leeds where she completed her degree in Textile Design. She joined the popular handloom brand Kandygs which is owned by her mother Sita Yahampath. In 2018, her contributions to export sector of the country were recognised by the Export Development Board and was awarded for the best innovative exporter.

On 4 December 2019, she was appointed as the new governor of the Eastern Province and thus became the first woman governor of the Eastern Province.

References 

Living people
Sri Lankan fashion designers
Sri Lankan women fashion designers
Sri Lankan businesspeople
Governors of Eastern Province, Sri Lanka
Alumni of the University of Leeds
Year of birth missing (living people)